Agiaon Assembly constituency is one of 243 constituencies of legislative assembly of Bihar. It is part of Arrah Lok Sabha constituency along with other assembly constituencies viz. Barhara, Arrah, Tarari, Jagdishpur, Shahpur and Sandesh.

Area/wards
Agiaon Assembly constituency comprises:

 Charpokhari CD block
 Garhani CD block
 Agiaon CD block

Overview
As per the estimates of 2011 census, out of total 352998 population 100% is rural and 0% is urban population. The Scheduled castes (SC) and Scheduled tribes (ST) ratio is 18.3 and 0.03, respectively out of total population. As per the voter list of 2019, there are 262907 electorates and 276 polling stations in this constituency.

Members of the Legislative Assembly
The Agiaon Assembly constituency was created in 2010. The list of the Members of the Legislative Assembly (MLA) representing Agiaon constituency is as follows:

2020 Elections

References

External links
 

Politics of Bhojpur district, India
Assembly constituencies of Bihar